WTKD (106.5 FM, "The Truth") is a radio station licensed to Greenville, Ohio serving most of the Dayton metropolitan area with a rimshot signal. The station is owned by Truth Broadcasting, Inc. The current programming features Christian talk and teaching radio using the Truth Network. The transmitter is in Greenville, Ohio.

WTKD is licensed by the FCC to broadcast in the hybrid digital HD format.

History
The station launched in 1990 as WLSN, owned by Treaty City Broadcasting airing beautiful music mixed with smooth jazz with a taller and more powerful transmitter installed north of Greenville replacing the less powerful WDRK tower on the south edge of town. Around this same time the former WHIO-FM switched from a similar format to country as WHKO "K-99.1 FM."

In 1997, WLSN was sold to Jacor Communications, later becoming WBKI ("Buckeye Country 106.5") in 1998 competing with WHKO until the merger with Clear Channel becoming WDJO (a call sign used previously at 1230 AM in Cincinnati) as "Dayton's Jammin' Oldies 106.5." But eventually, the late 1960s and '70s rhythmic oldies format failed to attract sizeable listeners. The WDJO calls themselves have since moved back to a station licensed to Cincinnati at 1480 AM, as a 1950s' and '60s' oldies station.

When a group of listeners of the former WLSN joined and complained about the lack of smooth jazz in the Dayton market, it was recommended that it would go back to what it was a decade earlier. Thus it became WDSJ, which enjoyed a considerably large following in the Dayton market, eastern Indiana and the northern suburbs of Cincinnati since its switch to smooth jazz. WDSJ aired programming from Broadcast Architecture's "Smooth Jazz Network."

On Friday May 1, 2009, the smooth jazz format ended at 5 pm Eastern time according to the WDSJ website. It became "106.5 The Bull" with a country music format and a new website that went online on the morning of May 2, 2009.

On March 25, 2010, WDSJ changed their format to classic hits, branded as "Big 106.5". They were using Premium Choice with voicetracked DJs.

On May 26, 2014, 106.5 changed callsigns from WDSJ to WOLT.

On June 20, 2014, 106.5 changed callsigns from WOLT to WRZX. The WOLT callsign is now assigned to the former WRZX 103.3 FM in Indianapolis.

In 2014, BIG 106.5 became Dayton's Christmas Music Station. After LITE 94.5 became B94.5, MIX 1077 became Dayton's Christmas Music Station, until 2014. Since 2014, Dayton's Christmas Music Station has been Big 106.5, and has been featured on Channel 2 (WDTN). BIG normally plays Christmas Music from mid November through Christmas Day.

In 2019, Big 106.5 officially flipped to Christmas Music as of Noon on November 1. Normally, Big 106.5 would flip anywhere from November 8, or as late as November 17 or 18.

On May 4, 2020, at 12:17 a.m., the station changed from ’70s and ’80s based classic hits to 1960s-based oldies. The final song under the classic hits format was Survivor's "High on You." The first song from the new format was Aretha Franklin's "Think." No explanation on the website or in social media was given for the change. The new slogan for the station is "Dayton's '60s and ’70s Hits."

On May 17, 2021, it was announced that WRZX and its sister station WYDB were being donated to Delmarva Educational Association from the trust. On July 9, the station slightly altered callsigns to WRZX-FM ahead of the sale; iHeart transferred the WRZX calls, with no addition, to another station of theirs in suburban Atlanta. The sale closed on August 2, 2021, with Delmarva Educational Association flipping the station to Christian radio at Midnight that day. The last song on "Big 106.5" was "Something" by The Beatles. The call letters were also changed to WTKD. Currently, the station is simulcasting WTOD in Toledo, and is running that station's ID announcements.

Previous logo

References

External links

TKD
Radio stations established in 1964
TKD